Tursk  is a village in the administrative district of Gmina Sulęcin, within Sulęcin County, Lubusz Voivodeship, in western Poland.

Notable people
Józef Kowalski, Polish-Soviet War veteran

References

Tursk